Luis Miguel Castilla Rubio is a Peruvian economist and politician. He was the  Minister of Economy and Finance of Peru, serving under President Ollanta Humala.

Educated in North America, and bilingual in Spanish and English, Miguel Castilla holds a B.A. with Honors in Economics and Business Administration from the McGill University in Montreal, Canada, a Master and a Ph.D. in Economics from the Johns Hopkins University in Baltimore, Maryland, and has taken a course in the Global Crisis and Financial Reform Program at Harvard University. He has held the positions of consultant to the World Bank vice president for North Africa and the Middle East, adviser to the executive chair of the Andean Development Corporation (CAF), and director of the Bank of the Nation of Peru. Castilla is also a member of the Inter-American Dialogue. He has also been a lecturer at the Johns Hopkins University and the University of the Pacific in Lima.

In the administration of President Alan García, Castilla has served as deputy minister of Finance under minister Mercedes Aráoz from January 2010 to July 2011. On 28 July 2011, newly elected President Ollanta Humala appointed him as Minister of Economy and Finance. The choice of Castilla – who is characterised as an orthodox pro-market economist – was estimated as a sign for Humala's intention to pursue a reasonable and moderate economic policy and to remove the fears of a radical shift to the left. On September 14, 2014, he resigned after spending three years in it, leaving economist Alonso Segura as his successor.

On January 6, 2015, he was appointed as Extraordinary and Plenipotentiary Ambassador of Peru to the United States. He held the position until July 2016.

In 2017, he was appointed as Manager of the Office of Strategic Planning and Development Effectiveness of the Inter-American Development Bank based in Washington, D.C.

Castilla says that Sovereign Wealth Funds are a new source of funding.

References

Peruvian Ministers of Economy and Finance
20th-century Peruvian economists
Johns Hopkins University alumni
McGill University alumni
World Bank people
Harvard University alumni
Living people
1968 births
Peruvian officials of the United Nations
Members of the Inter-American Dialogue
21st-century Peruvian economists